{{DISPLAYTITLE:C6H12O3}}
The molecular formula C6H12O3 may refer to:

 2-Ethoxyethyl acetate
 2-Hydroxyisocaproic acid
 4-Hydroxy-4-methylpentanoic acid
 Paraldehyde
 Propylene glycol methyl ether acetate
 Solketal
 9-Crown-3